Craig Richard Reichmuth (born September 22, 1947 in Russell, Manitoba) (died August 14, 2012 Trail, British Columbia) was a professional ice hockey player who played 189 games in the World Hockey Association. He played with the New York Raiders, San Diego Mariners, and Michigan Stags.

References

Sources
 

1947 births
Canadian ice hockey left wingers
New York Raiders players
New York Golden Blades players
Jersey Knights players
San Diego Mariners players
Michigan Stags players
Baltimore Blades players
Living people
Ice hockey people from Manitoba